The Night of the Emerald Moon is a 1985 Czech drama film directed by Václav Matějka. It was entered into the 35th Berlin International Film Festival.

Cast
Radoslav Brzobohatý as Janek Kysucan
 Jerzy Trela as Cyril Kysucan
 Pavol Višňovský as Vojta Kysucan
 Božidara Turzonovová as Marie, Cyril's spouse
 Magdaléna Vášáryová  as Slávka
 Pavel Nový as Perleťák
 Rudolf Hrušínský as Oskar
 Zlata Adamovská as Young mother
 Věra Kubánková as Old mother
 Yvetta Blanarovičová as Gipsy woman
 Milena Dvorská as Jarmila
 Pavel Kříž as Honza

References

External links

1985 films
1985 drama films
Czechoslovak drama films
1980s Czech-language films
Films directed by Václav Matějka
Czech drama films
1980s Czech films